Carns is an extinct town in Keya Paha County, in the U.S. state of Nebraska.

Carns bears the name of a pioneer settler. A post office called Carns was established in 1879, and remained in operation until 1943. An early variant name of the post office may have been Elm Grove.

References

Ghost towns in Nebraska
Landforms of Keya Paha County, Nebraska